Karimov or Carimoff is the Slavicised version of the name Karim. It is most popular in Central Asia, especially in Uzbekistan, although it is prevalent in the South Caucasus. Notable people with the surname include:

 Ayrat Karimov (1971–2020), Russian footballer in the Soviet First League from 1987
 Ergash Karimov (1935–2009), Uzbek comedian and comic actor
 Hayrulla Karimov (born 1978), international footballer who plays for PFC Kuruvchi
 Islam Karimov (1938–2016), first President of Uzbekistan, from 1990 to 2016
 Jamshid Karimov (born 1967), Uzbek journalist
 Jurabek Karimov (born 1998), Uzbekistani tennis player
 Latif Karimov (1906–1991), Azerbaijani carpet designer

See also
Kerimov
Karimova

Bashkir-language surnames
Kazakh-language surnames
Tajik-language surnames
Tatar-language surnames
Uzbek-language surnames
Patronymic surnames
Surnames from given names
Surnames of Uzbekistani origin